The men's team foil was one of seven fencing events on the programme for fencing at the 1924 Summer Olympics. It was the third appearance of the event.

The competition was held from Thursday June 27, 1924, to Sunday June 30, 1924. 12 teams, composed of 67 fencers, competed.

Rosters

Each team could have up to eight members. Four were selected for each match.

Results

Round 1

The top two teams in each pool advanced. Each team played each other team in its pool, unless a match was unnecessary as it would not alter qualification. Each team match included 16 bouts: four fencers from one team faced four fencers from the other team once apiece. Bouts were to five touches.

Pool A

Pool B

Pool C

Pool D

Pool E

Quarterfinals

The top two teams in each pool advanced. Each team played each other team in its pool. Each team match included 16 bouts: four fencers from one team faced four fencers from the other team once apiece. Bouts were to five touches.

Pool A

Pool B

Pool C
Belgium won its match against Argentina on touches, 61–56.

Semifinals

The top two teams in each pool advanced. Each team played each other team in its pool, unless the match was unnecessary to decide qualification. Each team match included 16 bouts: four fencers from one team faced four fencers from the other team once apiece. Bouts were to five touches.

Pool A

Pool B
Hungary won its match against Argentina on touches, 58–57.

Final

Each team played each other team. Each team match included 16 bouts: four fencers from one team faced four fencers from the other team once apiece. Bouts were to five touches.

References

 
 

Foil men team
Men's events at the 1924 Summer Olympics